Abdul Mannan Hossain (1952–2017) was an All India Trinamool Congress and Indian National Congress politician. He was Vidhan Sabha member and Lok Sabha member.

Early life
Abdul Mannan Hossain, son of Abdul Gafur and Khurma Beebi, was born on 15 October 1952 at Sealmara in Murshidabad district.

He graduated from R.K.N. College and became an educationist.

In 1971, he married Bulbul Begum they have two sons Rajib Hossain and Sowmik Hossain  and two daughters.

Political career
He was Zilla Parishad member in 1982–1984.

He was elected to the West Bengal State Assembly in 1987 from Murshidabad (Vidhan Sabha constituency).

He was elected to the Lok Sabha in 2004 and 2009 from Murshidabad (Lok Sabha constituency).

He joined the All India Trinamool Congress in September 2014.

References

1952 births
2017 deaths
21st-century Indian Muslims
Trinamool Congress politicians from West Bengal
People from Murshidabad district
India MPs 2004–2009
India MPs 2009–2014
West Bengal MLAs 1987–1991
Vidyasagar University alumni
India MPs 1999–2004
Lok Sabha members from West Bengal
United Progressive Alliance candidates in the 2014 Indian general election
West Bengal district councillors
20th-century Bengalis
21st-century Bengalis